Kodiosoma is a monotypic moth genus in the family Erebidae. Its only species, Kodiosoma fulvum, is found in Arizona, Nevada and California. Both the genus and species were described by Richard Harper Stretch in 1872.

The coloured area on the hindwings varies from gray to yellow or red. Adults have been recorded on wing from March to May.

Subspecies
Kodiosoma fulvum fulvum
Kodiosoma fulvum nigra (California)
Kodiosoma fulvum eavesi Stretch, 1872 (Nevada)
Kodiosoma fulvum tricolor Stretch, 1872 (Nevada)

References

Phaegopterina
Moths described in 1872
Monotypic moth genera